Şişli is one of the 39 districts of Istanbul, Turkey. Located on the European side of the city, it is bordered by Beşiktaş to the east, Sarıyer to the north, Eyüp and Kağıthane to the west, and Beyoğlu to the south. In 2009, Şişli had a population of 316,058.

It is also the name of a specific area of Şişli district centered on the Sişli Mosque.

History

Until the 1800s, Şişli was open countryside, used for hunting, agriculture and leisure. It was developed as a middle class residential district during the last years of the Ottoman Empire and the early years of the Turkish Republic (the late 19th-early 20th centuries). French culture was an important influence in this period and the wide avenues of Şişli were lined with large stone buildings with high ceilings and art nouveau wrought-iron balconies, and which often had little elevators on wires in the middle of the stairways. This trading middle-class was composed of Jews, Greeks and Armenians, as well as some Turks, many of whom built homes in Şişli after a large fire devastated the neighbouring district of Pera (now Beyoğlu) in 1870. To this day, several families from Istanbul's local Armenian community live in the Kurtuluş neighbourhood of Şişli. The area was also popular with the Levantine trading families of this period who settled in Istanbul for trade or were contracted by the Ottoman Empire. Şişli also attracted migrants from former possessions in Greece and the Balkans. In the late 19th century, Şişli was one of the first areas supplied with tramlines, electricity and natural gas. The Darülaceze orphanage and the large Şişli Etfal Hospital were built here in this period, as well as the French schools of St. Michel and Notre Dame de Sion.

Following the founding of the Turkish Republic in the 1920s, larger and larger buildings were built along wide avenues such as Halaskargazi Caddesi, the main road that runs through the middle of Şişli, with its little arcades of shops below tall apartment and office buildings. In the republican era, the area was still popular with the middle classes but also attracted a growing population of traders. Writers and poets also favoured the area, and Şişli acquired theatres, cafes and other cultural amenities. The Hilton Istanbul Bosphorus was built here in the 1950s and many others followed.

From the 1950s onwards people from Anatolia began to migrate to Istanbul in search of work. In most cases they built themselves illegal squats on unclaimed or government-owned land (see gecekondu). Some of these people settled in parts of Şişli in the 1950s and 1960s, especially in the northern sections of the district, around Mecidiyeköy.

The centre of Şişli today
Now that the wealthy elite of central Şişli has moved into less central suburbs of the city, the large buildings on the grand avenues are occupied by offices, banks, and big shops, forming the largest part of the Istanbul Central Business District. Since the 1970s most older buildings have been pulled down and replaced with newer, and perhaps less remarkable, multi-storey structures. The back streets are still residential, and many working-class families and students have settled here. There are plenty of shops, cafés, pubs, and other amenities. Additionally, Şişli's central location adds to its desirability.

Climate 
Şişli's climate is a relatively cool Mediterranean climate  (Csa/Cs) according to both the Köppen and the Trewartha climate classification. It is in plant hardiness zone 9a, and AHS heat zone 3.

Business and shopping

Being a central area well-served with public-transport and other infrastructure, Şişli is a center of trade and shopping. The main road through Şişli up to the skyscrapers of Mecidiyeköy, Gayrettepe, Levent and beyond is now lined with office blocks. Europe's largest and the world's second largest (urban-area) shopping mall, Cevahir İstanbul, is situated here. Due to Şişli's middle-class past and the enduring quality of some neighbourhoods the area is home to many upmarket shops mainly in the stylish and charming Nişantaşı area. Parking is an enduring problem, especially in the narrow side-streets.

People also come to Şişli for schooling; this city-centre area has some well-known high schools and a great number of dersane (preparatory courses for the annual university entrance exams), evening and weekend schools where people come to cram for university or high school entrance examinations, or to learn English.

There are many well-established cafes and restaurants, including fast-food for the students and shoppers.

Neighbourhoods

Şişli Merkez (lit. "Şişli Center") and Cumhuriyet Avenue (Cumhuriyet Caddesi) to its south, commonly called Bomonti after the former Bomonti Brewery, now repurposed as the Bomontiada arts center, including the Babylon event venue featuring regular live music. There’s also a presidential museum, and photography on display at the Ara Guler Museum. The name Bomonti is referenced in the name of the Bomonti Hilton hotel, the 39-story Bomonti Park tower, etc.
Esentepe - home to the Municipality of Şişli and Zincirlikuyu Cemetery. Neighboring Gayrettepe and Levent neighborhoods of Beşiktaş district and Mecidiyeköy neighborhood, Esentepe also covers the west side of Büyükdere Street at Levent, where most of the plazas are located.
Kurtuluş – formerly Tatavla ("horse stable") in the Ottoman period, was home to a Greek and later Armenian community. The district had mostly wooden houses until the fire on April 13, 1929. Afterwards, it was rebuilt in narrow stone streets and, over time, concrete buildings, lined with cafés, patisseries, and shops. This cosmopolitan district has a long history, and has been home to many singers, artists, and actors. There are a small number of old apartment buildings. It was also known mainly for its traditional carnival, which was organized every year before Lent. The peak of the carnival, on the last day of Lent, took place in Kurtuluş and was known as Baklahorani. After the riots of 1955, the Greek community left the area; however, their churches are open on religious holidays. 
Teşvikiye – uphill from Beşiktaş, an area with many classic European-style buildings as well as a busy high-class shopping district. Since the 19th century, Teşvikiye has been home to many writers (including journalist Abdi Ipekçi, who was assassinated here in 1979), politicians and a great number of prominent business families and still holds a well-established middle-class, including some descendants of Levantine and Jewish families that built many of the stone apartment buildings of Teşvikiye in the Ottoman period. Prominent buildings include the Milli Reasürans building, and the neo-Baroque Teşvikiye Mosque, who established the neighbourhood by building the mosque and the nearby historic Teşvikiye Police Station, encouraging citizens of Istanbul to settle in this new district (hence the name Teşvikiye, from teşvik, encouragement in Turkish.) Abdi İpekçi Avenue. There are a number of well-known schools, including some buildings of Marmara University and Işık Lisesi.
Nişantaşı – neighbourhood encompassing Teşvikiye and Harbiye, famous for its many Art Nouveau apartment buildings. The American Hospital, one of the city's best hospitals, is also located here. Nişantaşı is famous for high-end shopping along Abdi İpekçi Caddesi, Turkey's most expensive street in terms of lease prices, and the City's Nişantaşı mall. 
Mecidiyeköy – Business and shopping district north of the O-1 highway; Istanbul's main market for computer equipment. Narrow streets of tall office buildings. Home of Galatasaray football club's Ali Sami Yen Stadium. The Profilo Shopping Center, with its food court, cinemas and bowling alley, is here. Mecidiyeköy Antikacılar Çarşısı (Mecidiyeköy Antiques Bazaar), a large multi-storey building with dozens of antiques shops (the largest of its kind in Istanbul) is located at the eastern edge.
Okmeydanı – in the north of Şişli, home to some large hospitals. This was the archery practice ground of the Ottoman armies (hence the name, lit. the square of arrows), an Ottoman mosque was built here. Later the land was planted with fruit trees, and in the 1960s turned over to developers for building as the city expanded. Darülaceze, the Ottoman-period orphanage, is here, built in 1896.
Kuştepe – north of the O-1 highway, a gecekondu (illegally built) district of poor housing traditionally occupied by the Romani people in Turkey community and recent migrants from the countryside. Trump Tower and AVM (mall) are located here along the O-1.
Pangaltı - home to Saint James Armenian Hospital and Cathedral of the Holy Spirit.

Politics
The mayor of Şişli is Muammer Keskin from the Republican People's Party.

Places of interest

Museums and historical places
Istanbul Military Museum
Atatürk Museum
Ihlamur Palace
Monument of Liberty

Sport venues
Türk Telekom Stadium

Arts and entertainment venues
Cemal Reşit Rey Concert Hall
Cemil Topuzlu Open-Air Theatre
 Bomontiada, incorporating parts of the former Bomonti Brewery(tr)

Religious buildings
Şişli Mosque
Teşvikiye Mosque
Cathedral of the Holy Spirit

Shopping malls
 Cevahir Mall
Kanyon Shopping Mall
MetroCity AVM
Profilo Shopping Center

Tall buildings
Diamond of Istanbul
Istanbul Sapphire
Sabancı Center
Şişli Plaza

References

External links

 Şişli Municipality
 Official website of Mustafa Sarıgül, mayor of Şişli
 Atatürk Museum on Istanbul portal

 
Populated places in Istanbul Province
Districts of Istanbul Province
Istanbul Central Business District